Zinaida Sergeyevna Pronchenko (born September 11, 1981, Leningrad) is a Russian film historian, film critic, and journalist. She is the Chief editor of Iskusstvo Kino's site since April 1, 2020.

Biography
A native of Leningrad, Pronchenko graduated from the Faculty of History and Theory of Arts at the St. Petersburg Academy of Arts. She studied at the High Courses for Scriptwriters and Film Directors (workshop of Pyotr Todorovsky and Natalya Ryazantseva). She studied comparative art studies at the Higher School of European Cultures at the Russian State University for the Humanities. As a director, she shot several short films. She lived in France for several years.

Pronchenko is a regular contributor to a number of reputable publications on film and culture.

In March 2022, she signed a collective appeal of film critics, film historians and film journalists of Russia against Russian invasion of Ukraine.

Bibliography
 Alain Delon (2021)

References

External links
 Олег Кашин. «Слабоумие и трусость». Кинокритик Зинаида Пронченко о том, как слово «аутист» стало запретным на премьере фильма о людях с расстройствами
 Портрет кинокритика в огне: Зинаида Пронченко о французском кино

1981 births
Living people
Journalists from Saint Petersburg
Russian women journalists
Russian film critics
Russian women critics
Russian art historians
21st-century Russian women writers
Russian bloggers
Russian columnists
Russian women columnists
High Courses for Scriptwriters and Film Directors alumni
Writers from Saint Petersburg
Film theorists
Russian activists against the 2022 Russian invasion of Ukraine